Bharda Kalan is a village in Akhnoor Tehsil, Jammu district in Jammu and Kashmir, India.

Villages in Jammu district